Unaiz Farook (born 15 March 1973) is a Sri Lankan politician who represents the Vanni multi-member electoral district in the Sri Lankan Parliament. He is a member of the United People's Freedom Alliance and was elected in the 2010 Parliamentary elections.

References

Living people
Sri Lankan Muslims
Members of the 14th Parliament of Sri Lanka
United People's Freedom Alliance politicians
1973 births